Hervey Bay Airport  is the main airport for the city of Hervey Bay, Queensland, Australia and the Fraser Coast region which incorporates the nearby city of Maryborough.

Up until September 2006, Sunshine Express Airlines provided daily services to the airport from Brisbane. The airline ceased all scheduled operations on 1 October 2006 after a proposed acquisition by Regional Express Airlines was terminated and an intention by QantasLink for the introduction of Brisbane services was announced.

In 2006, the airport was the fastest growing in Queensland with passenger numbers almost doubling. Currently, plans are underway to further upgrade the airport to handle more jet services from other Australian capital cities. These plans involve the extension of the terminal to twice its current size, as well as a new cross runway (smaller than the main runway) to be used for general aviation purposes.

In June 2017, Fraser Coast mayor Chris Loft and JETGO announced that the airline would commence two direct services per week from Hervey Bay Airport to Melbourne's Essendon Airport, as well as direct services to Brisbane. Due to have commenced on 21 July 2017, the service never commenced due to lack of bookings. Services to and from Brisbane have been cancelled after JETGO entered voluntary administration.

Facilities 

Airlines and destinations

Statistics 
Hervey Bay Airport was ranked 39th in Australia for the number of revenue passengers served in financial year 2016–2017.

Statistics

See also 
 List of airports in Queensland

References

External links 
 Hervey Bay Airport

Airports in Queensland
Hervey Bay